Nakhon Pathom railway station is a railway station located in Phra Pathom Chedi Subdistrict, Nakhon Pathom City, and is located  from Thon Buri railway station. It is a class 1 railway station. The station is not far from Phra Pathom Chedi which is a famous landmark of the province. The station opened in June 1903 as part of the first phase of the Southern Line construction between Thon Buri Station to Phetchaburi Station.

During the 2011 Thailand floods, Nakhon Pathom Station was the terminus for most train services instead of Bangkok railway station as some sections between Nakhon Pathom and Bangkok were flooded.

Train services 

 Thaksinarath Express 31/32 Krung Thep Aphiwat – Hat Yai Junction – Krung Thep Aphiwat
 Thaksin Express 37/38 Krung Thep Aphiwat – Sungai Kolok – Krung Thep Aphiwat
 Special Express 39/40 Krung Thep Aphiwat – Surat Thani – Krung Thep Aphiwat
 Special Express 41/42 Krung Thep Aphiwat – Yala – Krung Thep Aphiwat (suspended due to COVID-19 pandemic)
 Special Express 43/44 Krung Thep Aphiwat – Surat Thani – Krung Thep Aphiwat
 International Express 45/46 Krung Thep Aphiwat – Padang Besar – Krung Thep Aphiwat
 Express 83/84 Krung Thep Aphiwat – Trang – Krung Thep Aphiwat
 Express 85/86 Krung Thep Aphiwat – Nakhon Si Thammarat – Krung Thep Aphiwat
 Rapid 167/168 Krung Thep Aphiwat – Kantang – Krung Thep Aphiwat
 Rapid 169/170 Krung Thep Aphiwat – Yala – Krung Thep Aphiwat
 Rapid 171/172 Krung Thep Aphiwat – Sungai Kolok – Krung Thep Aphiwat
 Rapid 173/174 Krung Thep Aphiwat – Nakhon Si Thammarat – Krung Thep Aphiwat (suspended due to COVID-19 pandemic)

 Ordinary 261/262 Bangkok(Hua Lamphong)-Hua Hin-Bangkok(Hua Lamphong)
 Commuter 355/356 Bangkok(Hua Lamphong)-Suphan Buri-Bangkok(Hua Lamphong)
 Ordinary 251/252 Thon Buri-Prachuap Khiri Khan-Thon Buri
 Ordinary 254/255 Lang Suan-Thon Buri-Lang Suan
 Ordinary 257/258 Thon Buri-Nam Tok-Thon Buri
 Ordinary 259/260 Thon Buri-Nam Tok-Thon Buri
 Ordinary 351/352 Thon Buri-Ratchaburi-Thon Buri

References 

 
 
 (untitled)

Railway stations in Thailand
Buildings and structures in Nakhon Pathom province
Railway stations opened in 1903